The 1905 International Cross Country Championships was held in Dublin, Ireland, at the Baldoyle Racecourse on 25 March 1905. 
A report on the event was given in the Glasgow Herald.

Complete results, medallists, 
 and the results of British athletes were published.

Medallists

Individual Race Results

Men's (8 mi / 12.9 km)

Team Results

Men's

Participation
An unofficial count yields the participation of 48 athletes from 4 countries.

 (12)
 (12)
 (12)
 (12)

See also
 1905 in athletics (track and field)

References

International Cross Country Championships
International Cross Country Championships
International Cross Country Championships
Cross
Cross
Cross country running in the United Kingdom
Cross country running in Ireland
International Cross Country Championships
Athletics in Dublin (city)
1900s in Dublin (city)